Kiersey or Keirsey, also known as Mead Junction, is an unincorporated community in Bryan County, Oklahoma, United States.  It is located about five mile west of Durant via US Route 70, then north on N3680 Rd (Silo Rd).  The town had a post office from June 16, 1904 until November 30, 1920. Keirsey was named after William D. Keirsey, who was a local rancher.

Notes

References
  

Unincorporated communities in Bryan County, Oklahoma
Unincorporated communities in Oklahoma